The 2011–12 PSV Eindhoven season saw the club competing in the 2011–12 Eredivisie, 2011–12 KNVB Cup and 2011–12 Europa League.

Players

Transfers

Summer

In:

Out:

Winter

In:

Out:

Competitions

Eredivisie

Results summary

Results by round

Results

League table

KNVB Cup

UEFA Europa League

Play-off round

Group stage

Knock-out stage

Statistics

Appearances and goals

|-
|colspan="14"|Players away from the club on loan:

|-
|colspan="14"|Players who left PSV during the season:

|}

Goal scorers

Disciplinary record

References

PSV Eindhoven seasons
Psv Eindhoven
Psv Eindhoven